The following is a list of women in leadership by nationality – notable women who are well known for their achievements in leadership.

Africa

Kenya
Vivienne Yeda Apopo, banker, director general of the East African Development Bank
Gina Din (born 1961), businesswoman working in strategic communication and public relations
Tabitha Karanja (born 1964), entrepreneur, CEO of Keroche Breweries
Stella Kilonzo (born 1975), former CEO of Capital Markets Authority (Kenya), manager at the African Development Bank

Morocco
Salwa Idrissi Akhannouch, businesswoman, founder and CEO of the Aksai Group with retail interests

Namibia
Clara Bohitile (born 1955), politician, businesswoman, chair of the Meat Corporation of Namibia
Monica Nashandi (born 1959), former diplomat and politician, former High Commissioner to the United Kingdom
Inge Zaamwani-Kamwi (born 1958), former government minister, former managing director of the Namdeb mining joint venture

Nigeria
Olajumoke Adenowo (born 1968), architect, businesswoman, head of the oil and gas firm Advantage Energy, founder of AD Consulting 
Folorunsho Alakija (born 1951), business tycoon in the fashion, oil and printing industries
Folake Coker (born 1974), fashion designer, founder of Tiffany Amber
Uche Eze (born 1983), social media expert, entrepreneur, founder of the BellaNaija online magazine
Kehinde Kamson (born 1961), entrepreneur, founder and CEO of the fast food company Sweet Sensation Confectionery
Abibatu Mogaji (1917–2013), business magnate, President-General, Association of Nigerian Market Women and Men
Ndidi Okonkwo Nwuneli (born 1975), social entrepreneur, co-founder of AACE Food Processing & Distribution, founder of LEAD Africa, a non-profit enterprise encouraging business leadership and development 
Bola Shagaya (born 1959), businesswoman, managing director of Practoil, board member of Unity Bank, Nigeria

Sierra Leone
Isha Johansen, since 2013, president of the Sierra Leone Football Association
Asma Mansour (born mid-1990s), entrepreneur, co-founded Tunisian Center for Social Entrepreneurship in 2011

South Africa
Judy Dlamini (born 1959), businesswoman, author, Chancellor of the University of the Witwatersrand and the founding chairman of Mbekani Group
Mpho Tshivhase (born 1986) philosopher at the University of Pretoria

Uganda
Barbara Birungi, technologist, founder of HiveColab 
Amina Moghe Hersi (born 1963), business executive in Kampala
Annet Nakawunde Mulindwa, managing director and chair of Finance Trust Bank

Asia-Pacific

Afghanistan
Fatema Akbari, founded the Women Affairs Council in 2004
Roya Mahboob, founder and CEO of Afghan Citadel Software

Australia 

 Rosie Batty (born 1962), Australian of the Year (2015)
 Julie Bishop (born 1956), foreign minister since 2013
 Jillian Broadbent (born 1948), business executive, board member of the Reserve Bank of Australia, chancellor of the University of Wollongong 
 Elizabeth Broderick, Former Australian Federal Sex Discrimination Commissioner 
 Dame Quentin Alice Louise Bryce (born 1942), Governor-General of Australia (2008–2014)
 Ita Buttrose (born 1942), journalist, businesswoman, former editor of the Australian Women's Weekly, President of Alzheimers Australia
 Kate Carnell (born 1955), former Chief Minister of the Australian Capital Territory, CEO of the Australian Chamber of Commerce and Industry 
 Kathryn Fagg, prominent businesswoman, board member of the Reserve Bank of Australia
 Julia Gillard (born 1961), prime minister (2010–2013)
 Carolyn Hewson, prominent businesswoman
 Cindy Hook, CEO, Deloitte Australia
 Joan Kirner (1938–2015), politician, 42nd Premier of Victoria
 Catherine Livingstone (born 1955), chair of the Business Council of Australia (2014)
 Tanya Plibersek (born 1969), Deputy Leader of the Opposition and the Australian Labor Party
 Heather Ridout (born 1954), businesswoman, chair of Australian Super, board member of the Reserve Bank of Australia
 Gina Rinehart (born 1954), mining magnate, chair of Hancock Prospecting
 Gillian Triggs (born 1945), President, Australian Human Rights Commission
 Alison Watkins, CEO, Coca-Cola Amatil Australia
 Jennifer Westacott, CEO, Business Council of Australia

China
Margaret Chan (born 1947), Chinese (Hong Kong) health specialist, director-general of the World Health Organization
Dong Mingzhu, business executive, president of Gree Electric
Ping Fu, Chinese-American entrepreneur, founder of Geomagic
Gu Kailai (born 1958), former lawyer, businesswoman
Liu Chaoying (born 1950s), former executive at China Aerospace International Holdings, Lt. Col in the People's Liberation Army
Peng Lei, co-founder and executive of Alibaba Group
Zihan Ling, entrepreneur and gender equality proponent, founded Techbase in 2015
Sheng Aiyi (1900–1983), entertainment entrepreneur, general manager of Shanghai BaiLeMen
Wu Ying (born 1981), former entrepreneur, convicted of fraud
Yang Huiyan (born 1981), majority shareholder of the Country Garden Holdings property group
Yang Lan (born 1986), co-founder and chair of Sun Media Group
Peggy Yu (born 1965), co-founder of Dangdang, an online retailer
Zhang Xin (born 1965), business executive, co-founder and CEO of the real estate developer SOHO China
Zhang Yin (born 1957), founder and director of Nine Dragons Paper Holdings Limited
Kelly Zong (born 1982), executive and purchasing manager of the  Hangzhou Wahaha beverage group

Hong Kong
Sally Aw (born 1926), newspaper owner until 1959
Flora Cheong-Leen (born 1959), business executive in fashion
Pollyanna Chu, executive with interests in finance and real estate
Lydia Dunn, Baroness Dunn (born 1940), business executive, former politician, held senior positions until 1995
Kwong Siu-hing (born 1929), controlling interests in Sun Hung Kai Properties
Michelle Sun, entrepreneur, founded First Code Academy in 2013
Yvonne Lui (born 1977), business executive, board member of several companies
Annie Wu, businesswoman, founder of Beijing Air Catering, involved in other catering joint ventures

India

Anuradha Acharya (born 1972), entrepreneur, founder and CEO of Ocimum Bio Solutions
Vinita Bali (born 1955), CEO of the food products corporation Britannia Industries
Avani Davda (born 1980), CEO of the joint venture between Starbucks and Tata Global Beverage
Bala Deshpande, senior managing director of the venture capital firm New Enterprise Associates (India)
Nisa Godrej, executive director of Godrej Consumer Products
Shyamala Gopinath (born 1949), former deputy governor of the Reserve Bank of India, chair of HDFC Bank
Vandana Luthra (born 1959), entrepreneur, founder of VLCC Health Care Ltd
Kiran Mazumdar-Shaw (born 1953), chair and CEO of Biocon
Megha Mittal (born 1976), chair and CEO of the German fashion firm Escada
Sumati Morarjee (1907–1998), headed the Scindia Steam Navigation Company
Leena Nair (born 1969), executive director, HR, Hindustan Unilever
Naveen Saini (born 1958), business executive, former CEO of ICICI Prudential, CEO of Oral Developers bank
Sheila Sri Prakash (born 1955), Founder and Chief Architect of Shilpa Architects, Board Member of the Chennai Smart Cities Ltd., Member of World Economic Forum’s Global Agenda Council on Design Innovation, Role of Arts in Society, and the Future Council on Sustainability and Resource Scarcity
Priya Paul (born 1967), Chairperson of Apeejay Surrendra Park Hotels (born 1967), chair of Apeejay Surrendra Park Hotels
Chitra Ramkrishna (born 1963), managing director and CEO, National Stock Exchange of India
Kirthiga Reddy (born c.1972), businesswomen, director of sales at Facebook India
Nicole Rodrigues-Larsen (born 1973), Dubai-based entrepreneur, founder and managing director of modelling and talent agencies
Usha Sangwan, business executive, managing director of Life Insurance Corporation of India
Devita Saraf (born 1981), founder and CEO of Vu Technologies
Ameera Shah (born 1979), CEO and Managing Director, Metropolis Healthcare
Shikha Sharma (born 1958), managing director and CEO of Axis Bank
Snehlata Shrivastava (born 1957), government administrator, business executive, board member of National Bank for Agriculture and Rural Development
Mallika Srinivasan (born 1959), chair and CEO of the TAFE farm equipment company
Mercy Williams (c.1947–2014), first woman to be mayor of Kochi

Indonesia
Karen Agustiawan (born 1958), former managing director and CEO of the Pertamina oil and gas concern
Megawati Sukarnoputri (born 1947), politician, President of Indonesia (2001–2004).
Mooryati Soedibyo (born 1928), politician, entrepreneur, founder and owner of Mustika Ratu cosmetics.
Sri Mulyani Indrawati (born 1962), former Managing Director of the World Bank Group, Minister of Finance of Indonesia.
Susi Pudjiastuti (born 1965), owner of Susi Air and PT ASI Pudjiastuti Marine Product, Minister of Maritime Affairs and Fisheries of Indonesia.
Tri Rismaharini (born 1961), politician, Mayor of Surabaya.

Israel
Orit Adato (born 1955), first woman to achieve a three-star rank in Israel

Japan
Tatsuuma Kiyo (1809–1900), leading role at the Hakushika sake brewing company
Sadako Ogata (born 1927), international political leader, widely known as the first woman to be appointed as head of the UNHCR (1990-2000)
Fumiko Hayashi (born 1946), businessperson and politician, former president of BMW Tokyo, CEO of Daiei Inc., and Mayor of Yokohama

Malaysia
Yvonne Chia (born c.1953), business executive, former CEO of Hong Leong Bank, currently CEO of Shell Refining, Malaysia
Wan Azizah Wan Ismail (born c.1952), Politician, former Deputy Prime Minister of Malaysia
Rafidah Aziz, Politician, Chairman of AirAsia X
 Muhaini Mahmud, Co-Founder Of Kiddocare App
 Melissa Ngiam, COO Of Yayasan Generasi Gemilang (GG)
 Jenn Low, Founder Of Wanderlust + Co
 Lovy Beh, Director Of BP Healthcare Group
 Raeesa Sya, Founder Of Orkid Cosmetics

New Zealand
Jacinda Ardern (born 1980), Prime Minister of New Zealand, former President of the International Union of Socialist Youth  
Theresa Gattung, business executive with senior positions in several companies including Bank of New Zealand and Telecom New Zealand
Bronwen Holdsworth (born 1943), business woman, arts patron, chair of the Holdsworth Group with interests in farming, property, investment and manufacturing
Pauline Kumeroa Kingi (born 1951), Māori community leader
Rosanne Meo, board member of several companies including television energy and financial interests
Annette Presley (born 1964), telecommunications entrepreneur, co-founder of Slingshot
Nicky Wagner (born 1953), politician, government minister outside of cabinet
Joan Withers, business executive, chair of Television New Zealand and the Mercury Energy electricity generation company

North Korea
Kim Kyong-hui (born 1946), former member of the Central Committee of the Workers' Party of Korea, former director of WPK Light Industry Department

Pakistan
Benazir Bhutto (1953–2007), Prime Minister of Pakistan
Begum Kulsum Saifullah Khan (1924–2015), businessperson, politician, chair of the textile conglomerate Saif Group
Fahmida Mirza (born 1956), politician, former speaker of the National Assembly of Pakistan

Philippines
Abby Jimenez, business executive, headed the advertising agency JimenezBasic
Patricia Santo Tomas, chair of the Development Bank of the Philippines

Saudi Arabia
Nabilah al-Tunisi (born c.1959), general manager of Northern Area Projects for the Saudi Aramco oil and gas company
Lubna Olayan (born 1955), influential businessperson, CEO of the Olayan Financing Company
Ameera al-Taweel (born 1983), princess, philanthropist, vice chairperson of Alwaleed Philanthropies

Singapore
Jannie Chan, entrepreneur, president of the Singapore Retailers Association
Jennie Chua, businessperson, co-founder of Beeworks, Inc.
Fatimah binte Sulaiman (c.1754–c.1852), merchant, philanthropist
Loke Cheng Kim (1895–1981), Malaysian-born businessperson, owner of the Ocean Park Hotel
Olivia Lum, founder and president of the Hyflux Group
Saw Phaik Hwa (born 1957), former president and CEO of SMRT Corporation

South Korea
Kim Sung-joo (born 1956), entrepreneur, founder and CEO of Sungjoo Group, chair and CEO of MCM Holdings

Sri Lanka
Neela Marikkar, chair of the Grant McCann Erickson advertising agency

Taiwan
Nancy T. Chang (born 1950), biochemist, co-founder of the U.S. pharmaceutical company Tanox
Eva Chen, business executive, co-founder and CEO of the Trend Micro security company
Shenan Chuang, CEO for Greater China at the Ogilvy & Mather advertising and marketing company

Thailand
Tarisa Watanagase (born 1949), economist, former governor of the Bank of Thailand

United Arab Emirates
Raja Al Gurg, influential business executive, managing director of Easa Saleh Al Gurg

Europe

Andorra 

 Lídia Armengol i Vila (1948–1991), civil servant who championed the restoration of her country's historic language and culture

Armenia
Matild Manukyan (1914–2001), leading property investor in Istanbul

Austria
Evelyn Lauder (1936–2011), Austrian American business executive, vice president of Estée Lauder Companies
Nadja Swarovski (born 1970), board member of the Swarovski crystal company

Belgium
Clara de Hirsch (1833–1899), businesswoman, philanthropist
Marie-Thérèse Rossel (1910–1987), newspaper editor, headed the Rossel publishing company

Croatia
Maja Ruth Frenkel, entrepreneur, business executive, politician

Czech Republic
Muriel Anton, economist, business executive, former CEO of Vodafone, Czech Republic
Maria-Elisabeth Schaeffler (born 1941), co-owner of the German Schaeffler Group manufacturer of rolling bearings

Denmark
Birgit Aagard-Svendsen (born 1956), executive vice president and CFO of the J. Lauritzen shipping company
Stine Bosse (born 1960), business executive, positions with TrygVesta, Allianz, Aker and president of the Royal Danish Theatre
Elsebeth Budolfsen (born 1947), pharmacist, business executive, has held senior positions in several important Danish companies
Lene Dammand Lund (born 1963), architect, educator, rector at the Royal Danish Academy of Fine Arts
Lene Espersen (born 1965), politician, business executive
Julie Fagerholt (born 1968), fashion designer, founder of the luxury clothing brand Heartmade
Mette Kynne Frandsen (born 1960), CEO and partner at Henning Larsen Architects
Karen Hækkerup (born 1974), politician, business executive, former minister
Vibeke Jensdatter (1638–1709), early merchant, landowner, successful in business
Hanni Toosbuy Kasprzak (born 1957), owner and chair of the ECCO shoe company
Camilla Ley Valentin (born 1973), business executive, co-founder and CCO of the queuing system Queue-it
Dorte Mandrup (born 1961), architect, founder and owner of Dorte Mandrup Arkitekter
Tine Roed (born 1964), administrator, business executive, deputy director-general at the Confederation of Danish Industries
Lene Tranberg (born 1956), head and co-founder of Lundgaard & Tranberg
Ane Mærsk Mc-Kinney Uggla (born 1948), business executive, chair of the A.P. Møller Foundation
Margrethe Vestager (born 1968), Danish politician, European Commissioner for Competition
Vibeke Windeløv (born 1950), film producer, has served on numerous corporate boards including the European Film Academy

Estonia
 Karoli Hindriks, entrepreneur
 Ester Tuiksoo, politician and business executive

Finland
Lenita Airisto (born 1937), influential business leader, culture and TV
Anne Brunila (born 1957), executive vice president of Fortum
Maija-Liisa Friman (born 1952), business executive, serving on the board of several companies
Valpuri Innamaa (died 1602), early merchant, shipowner
Sveta Planman (born 1979), fashion designer, CEO of JOLIER
Lisa Sounio (born 1970), fashion entrepreneur, business executive
Jaana Tuominen (born 1960), business executive, CEO of the coffee and cocoa company Gustav Paulig

France
Catherine Barba (born 1973), business executive active in digital retail
Patricia Barbizet (born 1955), holds various executive positions including CEO of Christie's
Suzanne Belperron (1900–1983), influential jewellery designer and business executive
Liliane Bettencourt (1922–2017), prominent businesswoman, top shareholder in L'Oréal
Anne Bouverot (born 1966), business executive, CEO of Morpho, former board member of the GSM Association
Coco Chanel (1883–1971), founder of Chanel
Madame Clicquot Ponsardin (1777–1866), owner and developer of the champagne brand Veuve Clicquot
Mercedes Erra (born 1954), business executive, co-founder of the BETC advertising agency, executive president of Havas Worldwide
Véronique Laury, CEO of the Castorama DIY chain
Anne Lauvergeon (born 1959), former CEO of the Areva energy group
Géraldine Le Meur (born 1972), innovator, business executive, co-founder of LeWeb conferences
Laurence Parisot (born 1959), former head of the MEDEF employers' union
Marie-Hélène Peugeot-Roncoroni (born c.1961), member of the board of PSA Peugeot Citroën
Dominique Reiniche (born 1955), chair of Coca-Cola Europe
Ariane de Rothschild (born 1965), banker, vice president of Edmond de Rothschild Holding
Marie-Laure Sauty de Chalon (born 1962), businesswoman, feminist, CEO of aufeminin
Corinne Vigreux (born 1964), business executive, co-founder and managing director of the Dutch consumer electronics company TomTom

Germany
Kerstin Günther (born 1967), business executive, senior positions in Deutsche Telekom Group
Susanne Klatten (born 1962), influential board member and majority shareholder of the chemicals manufacturer Altana
Aygül Özkan (born 1971), politician, former minister in Lower Saxony
Johanna Quandt (1926–2015), served as deputy chair of BMW
Anni Schaad (1911–1988), founded the jewellery company  Langani
Madeleine Schickedanz (born 1943), former billionaire shareholder in Quelle and Arcandor which declared bankruptcy in 2009
Leonore Semler (1921–2016), founder in 1963 of the German branch of the African Medical and Research Foundation
Sybill Storz (born 1937), heads the Karl Storz GmbH, a medical device company
Sylvia Ströher (born 1954), formerly headed the family's successful cosmetics business Wella, sold in 2004
Angela Merkel (born 1954), Chancellor of Germany (2005–2021)

Greece
Gianna Angelopoulos-Daskalaki (born 1955), politician, businesswoman, president of the bidding committee for the 2004 Summer Olympics
Zoe Cruz (born 1955), Greek-American banking executive, former co-president of Morgan Stanley
Angeliki Frangou, shipowner, chair and CEO of Navios Maritime Holdings
Helen Vlachos (1911–1995), newspaper-publishing proprietor, anti-junta activist

Iceland
Aslaug Magnusdottir, business executive in the fashion industry, CEO of Moda Operandi
Svafa Grönfeldt, former vice president of Actavis, president of Reykjavik University

Ireland
Elaine Coughlan, venture capitalist, co-founded of Atlantic Bridge Capital
Eileen Gray (1878–1976), pioneer of modern architecture in Ireland
Mary Guiney (1901–2004), former chair of the Clerys department store
Anne Heraty (born 1961), CEO of CPL Resources
Aedhmar Hynes (born 1966), business executive, member of several company boards
Louise O'Sullivan (born 1973), telecommunications executive, founder and CEO of Anam Technologies

Israel
Shari Arison (born 1957), businesswoman, owner of Arison Investments
Anat Cohen-Dayag, president and CEO of the biotechnology firm Compugen
Orit Gadiesh (born 1951), chair of the management consulting firm Bain & Company
Ofra Strauss (born 1960), chair of the Strauss food producing group

Italy
Barbara Labate (born c.1978), entrepreneur, co-founder and CEO of the comparative-pricing web company Risparmio Super

Netherlands
Johanna Borski (1764–1846), influential banker
Annette Nijs (born 1961), politician, former minister, China expert received China Government Friendship Award
Melanie Schultz van Haegen (born 1970), politician, former minister
Johanna Elisabeth Swaving (1754–1826), headed the early newspaper Oprechte Haerlemsche Courant
Marina Tognetti, Amsterdam-based business executive, launched the Myngle online learning service

Norway
Bettina Banoun (born 1972), lawyer, board member of the shipping company Wilh. Wilhelmsen
Mimi Berdal (born 1959), lawyer, business executive, chair or board member of several companies including Itera, Synnøve Finden and Q-Free
Lisbeth Berg-Hansen (born 1963), politician, business executive, chair of the Norwegian Institute of Marine Research, board member of several companies including Aker Seafoods
Ingeborg Moen Borgerud (born 1949), lawyer, former politician and business executive with board positions in several companies
Kjerstin Braathen (born 1970), Norwegian banker, CEO of DNB
Gro Brækken (born 1952), has held executive positions in several companies, since 2010 director of the Norwegian Oil Industry Association
Kari Gjesteby (born 1947), politician, businesswoman, has held several ministerial posts and has been a director of the Bank of Norway and the National Library of Norway
Elisabeth Grieg (born 1959), business executive, part owner of the Grieg Group, also holds several board positions
Annette Malm Justad (born 1958), businessperson, board member of several companies including Petroleum Geo-Services and Camillo Eitzen & Co
Wenche Kjølås (born 1962), businessperson, executive positions, including in companies belonging to the Grieg Group
Catharina Lysholm (1744–1815), ship-owner, managed Fru Agentinde Lysholm & Co
Åse Aulie Michelet (born 1952), businessperson, pharmacist, CEO of Marine Harvest
Gro Møllerstad (born 1960), businessperson, politician
Wenche Nistad (born 1952), businessperson, civil servant, has been director of Den norske Bank
Anette S. Olsen (born 1956), businessperson, owner and head of the Fred. Olsen shipping company
Margareth Øvrum (born 1958), civil engineer, businessperson, executive vice president at Statoil
Hanne Refsholt (born 1960), agronomist, businessperson, CEO of the dairy cooperative Tine
Karin Refsnes (born 1947), civil servant, businessperson
Marit Reutz (born 1952), businessperson, former chair of the National Library of Norway
Berit Svendsen (born 1963), engineer, businessperson, vice president of the Telenor Group, head of Telenor Norway
Karen Toller (1662–1742), early shipowner
Aud Marit Wiig (born 1953), diplomat, businessperson, ambassador to Pakistan

Poland
Barbara Hulanicki (born 1936), fashion designer, founder of the London store Biba
Alicja Kornasiewicz (born 1951), politician, businessperson, former government minister
Helena Rubinstein (1872–1965), Polish American business magnate

Portugal
Antonia Ferreira (1811–1896), early businesswoman associated with port wine
Gracia Mendes Nasi (1510–1569), Renaissance business figure with her business partner Joseph Nasi

Romania
Maria Antonescu (1892–1964), philanthropist, wife of Prime Minister Ion Antonescu
Mariana Gheorghe (born 1956), general manager of the oil company Petrom
Monica Iacob Ridzi (born 1977), politician, member of the European Parliament
Sorina-Luminița Plăcintă (born 1965), politician, former minister
Carmen Radu, former President and CEO of Exim Bank
Irina Schrotter (born 1965), fashion designer, businessperson
Ileana Sonnabend (1914–2007), art dealer, ran the Sonnabend Gallery in New York City

Russia
Yelena Baturina (born 1963), businessperson, former mayor of Moscow, founded the investment and construction company Inteco
Natalya Kaspersky (born 1966), former chair of the antivirus company Kaspersky Lab
Margarita Louis-Dreyfus (born 1962), Russian-born Swiss chair of the Louis Dreyfus conglomerate

Serbia
Madlena Zepter, founder and owner of the Madlenianum Opera and Theatre

Spain
Esther Koplowitz, Marquise of Cubas (born 1953), businessperson, vice president of Fomento de Construcciones y Contratas
Ana Maiques (born 1973), entrepreneur, CEO of Neuroelectrics

Sweden
Gunilla Asker (born 1962), CEO of the newspaper Svenska Dagbladet
Maria Borelius (born 1960), former minister, business executive
Anna Bråkenhielm (born 1966), business leader active in television and the media
Mia Brunell (born 1965), CEO of the Axel Johnson investment company
Stina Ehrensvärd (born 1967), Swedish-American entrepreneur, CEO of Yubico, co-inventor of the YubiKey
Marie Ehrling (born 1955), business executive, chair of TeliaSonera
Annika Falkengren (born 1962), president and CEO of Skandinaviska Enskilda Banken
Karin Forseke (born 1955), former CEO of Carnegie Investment Bank
Sofia Gumaelius (1840–1915), early businesswoman, founder of the Gumaelius advertising agency
Hanna Hammarström (1829–1909), inventor, industrialist, manufactured telephone wires
Helena Helmersson (born 1973), senior manager at the H&M retail clothing company
Antonia Ax:son Johnson (born 1943), chair of Axel Johnson
Bonnie Roupé (born 1976), founder of the Chinese health company Bonzun
Cecilia Stegö Chilò (born 1959), politician, businessperson
Azita Shariati (born 1968), heads the Swedish branch of the catering and services multinational Sodexo
Wilhelmina Skogh (1849–1926), hotel manager and owner
Cristina Stenbeck (born 1977), chair and main owner of Investment AB Kinnevik
Charlotte Strömberg (born 1959), former CEO of the JLL real estate company
Louise Wachtmeister (born 1978), entrepreneur, athlete, political activist

Switzerland
Ruth Guler (1930–2015), hotel owner
Nayla Hayek (born 1951), business executive, chair of the Swatch Group
Dominique Lévy, art dealer, owner of the Dominique Lévy Gallery
Margarita Louis-Dreyfus, businesswoman, chair of Louis Dreyfus Group
Vera Michalski (born 1954), president of several publishing houses

Turkey
Suzan Sabancı Dinçer (born 1965), chair of Akbank, board member of Sabancı Holding
Matild Manukyan (1914–2001), real estate investor
Güler Sabancı (born 1955), chair of Sabancı Holding
Sevgi Sabancı (born 1963), businessperson with interests in several companies
Serpil Timuray, CEO of Vodafone Turkey
Arzuhan Yalçındağ (born 1965), chair of Doğan Holding

United Kingdom
 See :Category:British women in business
Melanie Dawes (born 1966), Permanent Secretary of the Department for Communities and Local Government
Liliane Landor (born c.1956), Lebanese born journalist and broadcasting executive

North America

Bahamas
Betsy Boze, business executive, past president of the College of The Bahamas

Canada
Alison Redford (born 1965), 14th Premier of Alberta
Catherine Callbeck (born 1939), 28th Premier of Prince Edward Island, first female provincial premier to win a general election\
Christy Clark (born 1965), 35th Premier of British Columbia
Eva Aariak (born 1955), 2nd Premier of Nunavut, represent the electoral district of Iqaluit East in the Legislative Assembly of Nunavut	
Kathleen Wynne (born 1953), 25th Premier of Ontario
Kathy Dunderdale (born 1952), 10th Premier of Newfoundland and Labrador
Kim Campbell (born 1947), 19th Prime Minister of Canada, chairperson for Canada's Supreme Court Advisory Board
Lois Mitchell (born 1939/1940), businesswoman and philanthropist, the 18th Lieutenant Governor of Alberta 
Nellie Cournoyea (born 1940), 6th Premier of the Northwest Territories, first female Premier of a Canadian territory, Norwegian and Inupiaq heritage
Pat Duncan (born 1960), 6th Premier of the Yukon, first female Premier of the Yukon
Pauline Marois (born 1949), 30th Premier of Quebec
Rachel Notley (born 1964), 17th Premier of Alberta
Rita Johnston (born 1935), politician in British Columbia, first female Premier in Canada, 29th Premier of British Columbia
Sonja Bata (born 1926), Swiss-born business woman, founder and chair of the world's largest shoe museum

El Salvador
María Eugenia Brizuela de Ávila (born 1956), lawyer, business executive, former foreign minister

Mexico
María Asunción Aramburuzabala (born 1963), business executive, chair of Tresalia Capital
Angélica Fuentes (born 1963), business executive, founder of the cosmetics brand Angelíssima, executive and shareholder of Omnilife-Angelissima-Chivas
Bertha González Nieves (born 1970), businesswoman, co-founder and CEO of the Casa Dragones tequila company
Eva Gonda de Rivera, owns a major stake in the FEMSA beverage company

Puerto Rico
María Luisa Arcelay (1898–1981), educator, businesswoman, politician
Camalia Valdés (born 1972), president and CEO of the brewery Compañía Cervecera de Puerto Rico

United States
See :Category:American women in business, :Category:American women in politics

Jewel Freeman Graham (born 1925), educator, social worker, second black woman to head the YWCA
Zipporah Michelbacher Cohen (1853 – 1944) American civic leader, president Ladies Hebrew Benevolent Association in Richmond, Virginia
  Jennifer Martin American Author and Leader Born in Canada in 1973. A successful leader in Business Startups, an American actress, producer, and author.

South America

Argentina
Beatriz Rojkés de Alperovich (born 1956), Argentine senator

Brazil
Samantha Aquim, founder of Q-Zero Chocolate
Vera Cordeiro (born 1950), founder of Brazil Child Health
Maria Helena Moraes Scripilliti, co-owner of the Votorantim Group
Eliana Tranchesi, entrepreneur, owner of the Daslu fashion house
Luiza Helena Trajano, entrepreneur, chairwoman of the Magazine Luiza retail company

Chile
Ingrid Antonijevic (born 1952), entrepreneur, business executive, politician

Peru
Keiko Fujimori (born 1975), politician, former First Lady
Lourdes Mendoza (born 1958), businessperson, politician

Uruguay
Laetitia d'Arenberg (born 1941), business executive, owner of several companies

Venezuela
Laetitia d'Arenberg, business executive, luxury fashion entrepreneur
Hilda Ochoa-Brillembourg (born 1945), founder and CEO of Strategic Investment Group

References

Lists of women
Lists of female office-holders
Lists of women by occupation

Leadership